Excuse My Dust is a 1951 musical comedy film starring Red Skelton. It was directed by Roy Rowland and an uncredited Edward Sedgwick.

Plot
Amateur inventor Joe Belden has his Indiana hometown in a tizzy over his new "horseless carriage" in 1895. It runs on gasoline, but the townspeople aren't impressed and only Joe's mom and his sweetheart Liz Bullitt are supportive.

Mechanical breakdowns make Joe even more unpopular with some, including Liz's father, who prefers his daughter's other suitor, Ivy Leaguer Cyrus Ransom, Jr.

A $5,000 first prize in a road race attracts newfangled contraptions from all over the land. Cy enters one himself that runs on ether and cheats in every way he can to drive Joe off the road. He succeeds, but Liz comes to the rescue and joins Joe all the way to the finish line—well, almost all the way.

Cast
 Red Skelton as Joe Belden
 Sally Forrest as Liz Bullitt (singing voice dubbed by Gloria Gray)
 Macdonald Carey as Cyrus Ransom, Jr.
 William Demarest as Harvey Bullitt
 Monica Lewis as Daisy Lou
 Raymond Walburn as Mayor Fred Haskell
 Jane Darwell as Mrs. Belden
 Lillian Bronson as Mrs. Matilda Bullitt
 Herbert Anderson as Ben Parrott 
 Paul Harvey as Cyrus Random, Sr.
 Marjorie Wood as 	Mrs. Cyrus Random Sr.
 Lee Scott as Horace Antler
 Alex Gerry as Mr. Antler
 Jim Hayward as Nick Tosca
 Will Wright as Race judge

Production
The film was an original script by George Wells. Van Johnson was at one stage intended to star.

Musical numbers
 I'd Like to Take You Out Dreaming
Performed by Macdonald Carey and Chorus

 Lorelei Brown
Performed by Monica Lewis and Chorus, introduced by Herbert Anderson and Sally Forrest

 Goin' Steady
Sung by Macdonald Carey, Monica Lewis, Sally Forrest, Red Skelton and Chorus

 Spring Has Sprung
Performed by Red Skelton and Sally Forrest (dubbed by Gloria Gray)

 Get a Horse
Performed by Macdonald Carey, William Demarest and Chorus

 That's for Children
Performed by Monica Lewis, Red Skelton and Chorus

 Lorelei Brown (reprise)
Danced by Sally Forrest and Chorus

 Spring Has Sprung (reprise)
Sung by Sally Forrest (dubbed by Gloria Gray)

Reception
According to MGM records, the film earned $1,645,000 in the US and Canada and $653,000 elsewhere, resulting in a loss of $501,000.

References

External links

1951 films
1951 musical comedy films
American musical comedy films
American auto racing films
Films directed by Roy Rowland
Films set in Indiana
Films set in the 1890s
Metro-Goldwyn-Mayer films
Films with screenplays by George Wells
Films with screenplays by Buster Keaton
Films directed by Edward Sedgwick
1950s historical comedy films
American historical comedy films
American historical musical films
1950s English-language films
1950s American films